Prema Chandra Imbulana (18 October 1920 – 28 September 2012) was a Sri Lankan politician who was elected to the Ceylonese Parliament representing Ruwanwella and served as the Minister of Labour.  He was appointed as the first Governor of Uva Province and subsequently the second Governor of Central Province.

Imbulana was born in Ruwanwella on 18 October 1920, the son of Kuruvitaarachchilage Martin Appuhamy Imbulama, the village headman. He attended Trinity College, Kandy.
 Prema was elected as the youngest Village Council Chairman of Ruwanwella and was one of the founding members of the United National Party in 1946. He unsuccessfully ran for parliament in the Ruwanwella Electoral District three times (1947, 1952 and 1960). He was however successful on his fourth attempt at the July 1960 parliamentary elections, receiving over 53% of the vote. Prema was re-elected in 1965 and was made the Deputy Minister of Agriculture in the Dudley Senanayake government. In the Jayewardene government he was appointed Deputy Minister Local Government, Housing and Construction before he was appointed Minister of Labour in the Premadasa cabinet. With the formation of the newly established Provincial Councils Prema was selected in May 1988 as the first Governor of Uva Province a position he retained until January 1990, when on 1 February 1990 he was appointed as the second Governor of Central Province where he served until he retired in May 1994.

References

Governors of Uva Province
Governors of Central Province, Sri Lanka
Sri Lankan Buddhists
United National Party politicians
Members of the 8th Parliament of Sri Lanka
Parliamentary secretaries of Ceylon
Deputy ministers of Sri Lanka
1920 births
2012 deaths
Sinhalese politicians
Alumni of Trinity College, Kandy